Ryne Robinson (born November 4, 1984) is a former American football wide receiver. He was drafted by the Carolina Panthers in the fourth round of the 2007 NFL Draft. He played college football at Miami University. He is a graduate of Central Catholic High School (Toledo, Ohio).

Robinson has also been a member of the Florida Tuskers.

High school
Three-year letterwinner as a wider receiver and defensive back for Central Catholic High School (Toledo, Ohio)
Three-time all-Toledo City League selection
Two-time all-district honoree
2002 District Offensive Player of the Year
Totaled 62 receptions for 1,035 yards and 16 touchdowns as a senior
Averaged 25.3 yards per punt as a senior, returning two for touchdowns
Also grabbed five interceptions as a senior
Helped the Irish to a three-year record of 27-8

College career

Baseball
Robinson was a left fielder for the RedHawks baseball team. He played in 157 games, and ended with a .284 batting average.  He holds the school single-season records for triples (8) and stolen bases (34).

Football
Robinson played for the RedHawks' football team as a freshman, mostly on special teams. He finished his first year with a school record for most punt return yards in a season (674), and set a Mid-American Conference record for yards in a game, when he returned 274 yards against the University at Buffalo. In his junior year, he became only the third player in school history to top 1,000 receiving yards in a single season, which he duplicated his senior year. In four years, he amassed a total of 3,697 receiving yards on 258 catches, both school records. His 1,677 punt return yards are the third most in NCAA history.

Professional career

Carolina Panthers
Robinson was taken in the fourth round (118th overall) of the 2007 NFL Draft by the Carolina Panthers.

On October 8, 2008, Robinson was placed on season-ending injured reserve as the team signed wide receiver Kenneth Moore.

The Panthers waived Robinson on August 31, 2009.

Florida Tuskers
Robinson was signed by the Florida Tuskers of the United Football League on August 26, 2010.
Robinson is the second cousin of JoJuan Armour.

External links
Miami RedHawks bio

1984 births
Living people
Sportspeople from Toledo, Ohio
Players of American football from Ohio
American football wide receivers
American football return specialists
Miami RedHawks football players
Carolina Panthers players
Florida Tuskers players